The 2001 FedEx Championship Series season, the twenty-third in the CART era of U.S. open-wheel racing, consisted of 20 of the 22 originally scheduled races, beginning in Monterrey, Mexico on March 11 and concluding in Fontana, California on November 4. What would have been the third race in the season, the Firestone Firehawk 600 in Fort Worth, Texas was canceled after qualifying due to safety concerns. The FedEx Championship Series Drivers' Champion was Gil de Ferran, while the Rookie of the Year was Scott Dixon.

Off the track, the 2001 season was an unmitigated disaster for CART, featuring two race cancellations, a disastrous European tour that coincided with the September 11 attacks, infighting amongst engine manufacturers that saw litigation and the announced future departure of Honda and Toyota, the loss of the series' television contract, the loss of longtime tracks Michigan and Nazareth, and the withdrawal of Team Penske at the conclusion of the season.

Team Penske and Team Motorola joined Chip Ganassi Racing in having concurrent IRL teams to run in the 2001 Indianapolis 500, with Penske's Castroneves winning the race. In an unusual move, CART "sanctioned" the participation of teams in the race; This was an attempt to allow Penske's primary sponsor, Marlboro, to appear on cars in the 500 as they were prohibited from being in more than one racing series by the Tobacco Master Settlement Agreement. This legal maneuver was not successful, and Penske's cars ran without advertising. DaimlerChrysler shut down their CART program as an engine manufacturer via Mercedes-Benz brand as DaimlerChrysler decided to move to NASCAR Winston Cup Series via Dodge brand in the same year.

Drivers and constructors 
The following teams and drivers competed in the 2001 CART Championship Series season. All cars ran on Firestone Tires.

Season summary

Schedule 

 Oval/Speedway
 Dedicated road course
 Temporary street circuit

 The original calendar called for 22 races on five continents, by far the most ambitious calendar CART had ever attempted. With the race at Texas being canceled and the Rio 200 being dropped, the 2001 season ultimately had the same number of races as the previous year.
 For the first time, CART would race in the United Kingdom and Germany and also return to Mexico for the first time in almost twenty years.
 The original calendar released on August 5, 2000, had the first round of the season at Jacarepaguá in Brazil, but disagreements with the track owners several months later led to the event being dropped.
 The events at Homestead-Miami and Gateway were dropped after negotiations with the owners of the track; rival series Indy Racing League secured the contracts instead, and both tracks were featured in the 2001 Indy Racing League season.
 The removal of Gateway from the calendar meant that Memorial Day weekend would be empty, allowing several teams and drivers the opportunity to compete at the Indianapolis 500.

Race results

Final driver standings

 Kenny Bräck also awarded 1 point for his pole position in Fort Worth. The race was canceled after qualifying due to excessively high speeds.
 Toranosuke Takagi was penalized 2 points for rough driving in Toronto.
 Alex Zanardi's car was impacted from the side by Alex Tagliani's car at EuroSpeedway Lausitz. He lost both of his lower legs in the impact. This signaled the end of his open-wheel racing career.

Nation's Cup 

 Top result per race counts towards Nation's Cup.

Chassis Constructor's Cup

Engine Manufacturer's Cup

References

See also
 2001 Toyota Atlantic Championship season
 2001 Indianapolis 500
 2001 Indy Racing League
 2001 Indy Lights season

Champ Car seasons
CART
CART
 
CART